Carotti is an Italian surname. Notable people with the surname include:

Bruno Carotti (born 1972), French footballer and sporting director
Gabriello Carotti (born 1960), Italian footballer
Lorenzo Carotti (born 1985), Italian footballer

See also
Marotti

Italian-language surnames